Ophioparma is a genus of crustose lichens in the family Ophioparmaceae.

Species
Ophioparma handelii 
Ophioparma junipericola  – Spain
Ophioparma lapponica 
Ophioparma pruinosa  – China
Ophioparma ventosa

References

Umbilicariales
Lecanoromycetes genera
Lichen genera
Taxa described in 1852